Soft may refer to:

 Softness, or hardness, a property of physical materials

Arts and entertainment
 Soft!, a 1988 novel by Rupert Thomson
 Soft (band), an American music group
 Soft (album), by Dan Bodan, 2014
 Softs (album), by Soft Machine, 1976
 "Soft", a song by Kings of Leon on the 2004 album Aha Shake Heartbreak
 "Soft"/"Rock", a 2001 single by Lemon Jelly

Other uses
 Sorgenti di Firenze Trekking (SOFT), a system of walking trails in Italy
 Soft matter, a subfield of condensed matter
 Magnetically soft, material with low coercivity
 soft water, which has low mineral content 
 Soft skills, a person's people, social, and other skills
 Soft commodities, or softs
A flaccid penis, the opposite of "hard"

See also
 
 
 Softener (disambiguation)